Sakesphorus is a genus of passerine birds in the antbird family, Thamnophilidae.

The genus Sakesphorus was erected by the British ornithologist Charles Chubb in 1918 with the black-crested antshrike as the type species. The name of genus is from the Ancient Greek sakesphoros  "shield-bearing", from sakos "shield" and -phoros "-bearing".

The genus contains the following species:
 Black-crested antshrike (Sakesphorus canadensis)
 Glossy antshrike (Sakesphorus luctuosus)

References

 

 
Bird genera
 
Taxonomy articles created by Polbot